was a Japanese singer, record producer, and actor. With a career spanning six decades, he was a major figure in Japanese popular music.

He appeared in numerous films, such as Nagisa Ōshima's Merry Christmas, Mr. Lawrence, and won two best acting awards. He also starred in the American film Black Rain.

Career
Uchida was born in Nishinomiya. He dropped out of high school at age 17 and began his music career in 1957. He became friends with John Lennon after opening for The Beatles on their 1966 tour of Japan.

Shocked after seeing Jimi Hendrix perform in London in 1967, Uchida returned home and wanted to introduce a similar sound to Japan. He formed Yuya Uchida & The Flowers who released the album Challenge! in 1969, which is composed almost entirely of covers of Western psychedelic rock acts. After replacing all but one member and reverting to a producer/manager role himself, the group changed their name to Flower Travellin' Band and released another cover album, 1970's Anywhere, before relocating to Canada. Before the move they recorded an album of original material in just two days; Satori was released in North America in 1971 by GRT Records. The band produced two more albums, Made in Japan (1972) and Make Up (1973), before separating for 34 years.

In addition to his solo career and Flower Travellin' Band, he worked with a large variety of musicians both domestic and international, and recorded with The Ventures and Frank Zappa in the mid-1970s. In 1975 he produced an international music festival titled "World Rock Festival" which featured artists from around the world performing together. That same year, Uchida also produced the self-titled album by Creation.

He unsuccessfully ran for the 1991 Tokyo gubernatorial election.

Uchida collaborated with pop idol Rino Sashihara for the 2014 duet single "Shekina Baby".

Personal life and legal troubles
Yuya Uchida married actress Kirin Kiki in 1973. The two separated two years later but remained married. Their daughter Yayako Uchida is an essayist/singer and married to actor Masahiro Motoki, who was adopted into the Uchida family as a mukoyōshi. Yuya was the grandfather to three children by his daughter.

Uchida was arrested in September 1977 for violating Japan's Cannabis Control Law. Although Uchida admitted ten years later that he was smoking it at the time, the charges were dropped Nolle prosequi. He was arrested again in 1983 for violating Japan's Firearm and Sword Possession Control Law. Uchida entered the offices of Udo Artists, Inc. with a kitchen knife and threatened a rock promoter for allegedly paying foreign artists far more money than Japanese ones. Again, he was never indicted.

Uchida successfully underwent emergency eye surgery on May 31, 2005 for a blocked retinal artery, which would have led to blindness. In mid-November 2005, his house was broken into and several watches and jackets were stolen.

On May 13, 2011, Uchida was arrested for assault and trespassing after threatening his former girlfriend, whom he began dating in December 2009. The police said that Uchida allegedly hit the 50-year-old woman after she tried ending their relationship in March and began sending her threatening letters. The woman said she had her locks changed, but Uchida then had another locksmith open the door and entered her house on April 19. Uchida acknowledged writing the letters and having spare keys made to her house, but denied threatening her.

Death
Yuya Uchida died from pneumonia in a Tokyo hospital on March 17, 2019, aged 79. He received a Lifetime Achievement Award at the 61st Japan Record Awards on December 30, 2019.

Discography
Singles

"Gonna Make It Tonight/Let's Twist No. 1" (1977)
"What's Happening, Mr. Dylan?/Annie Get Your Guns" (1978)
"Sake, Women & My Life/One Night Lullabye" (1979)
"The Long Goodbye/Farewell My Lovely" (1982)
"Killer in the Rain/Rolling on the Road" (1982)
"Annie for a Cheek Time/No More Comics" (1985)

Albums

Challenge! (1969, Yuya Uchida & The Flowers)
Y.U.Y.A 1815KC Rock'n Roll Broadcasting Station (1973)
Exciting! Rock 'n' Roll Party (1973, Yuya Uchida and the 1815 Super Rock 'n' Roll Band)
Hollywood (1975, Yuya Uchida and The Ventures)

No More Comics (1985)

Filmography

References

External links 
  
 Official international website

1939 births
2019 deaths
Japanese male film actors
Japanese male rock singers
People from Nishinomiya
Tokyo gubernatorial candidates
Musicians from Hyōgo Prefecture
English-language singers from Japan
Deaths from pneumonia in Japan